Neeraj Chopra,PVSM, VSM (born 24 December 1997) is a track and field athlete from India. He is the reigning Olympic champion, silver medalist in the World Championship, and the Diamond League champion in Javelin throw. He is the first Asian athlete to win an Olympic gold medal in Men's Javelin throw. A Junior Commissioned Officer (JCO) in the Indian Army, Chopra is the first track and field athlete to win a gold medal for India at the Olympics. He is also the first track and field athlete from India to win at the IAAF World U20 Championships, where in 2016 he achieved a world under-20 record throw of 86.48 m, becoming the first Indian athlete to set a world record.

Chopra participated in the 2018 Commonwealth Games and the 2018 Asian Games, serving as the flag-bearer in the latter and winning gold medals in both. In his debut at the 2020 Tokyo Olympics, Neeraj won the gold medal with a throw of 87.58 m in his second attempt. , he is one of only two Indians to have won an individual Olympic gold medal (the other being Abhinav Bindra), as well as the youngest-ever Indian Olympic gold medalist in an individual event, and the only individual to have won gold on his Olympic debut.

On 14 June 2022, at the Paavo Nurmi Games, he registered a new national record of 89.30m in Turku, Finland, Chopra eventually beat his own record by reaching 89.94m at Stockholm Diamond League in Sweden on 30 June 2022.

On 23 July 2022, Chopra won a Silver medal in 2022 World Athletics Championships with a throw of 88.13m, making him the second Indian to win a medal at World Athletics Championships.

Early life and education
Neeraj Chopra was born in a Ror family in  Khandra Panipat, Haryana. He has two sisters and his family is largely involved in agriculture. He did his schooling from BVN Public School.

Impressed with Chopra's performance at the South Asian Games and his future potential, the Indian Army offered him a direct appointment as a Junior Commissioned Officer (JCO) in the Rajputana Rifles with the rank of Naib Subedar. He accepted the offer and joined the army under sports quota.

Athletics career

Early training 
After local children teased him about his childhood obesity, Chopra's father enrolled him in a gymnasium at Madlauda; he was later enrolled in a gym in Panipat. While playing at Shivaji stadium in Panipat, he saw some javelin throwers and began participating himself.

Chopra visited the Panipat Sports Authority of India (SAI) centre, where javelin thrower Jaiveer Choudhary recognised his early talent in the winter of 2010. Observing Chopra's ability to achieve a 40-metre throw without training and impressed by his drive, Choudhary became his first coach. Chopra learned the basics of the sport from Choudhary and a few more experienced athletes who had trained under a javelin coach in Jalandhar. He soon won his first medal, a bronze in the district championships, and then persuaded his family to allow him to live in Panipat while developing his abilities.

After training under Choudhary for a year, the 13-year-old Chopra was admitted to the Tau Devi Lal Sports Complex in Panchkula. The sports complex was then one of only two facilities in the state of Haryana with a synthetic runway. There, he trained under coach Naseem Ahmad, a running coach who made him train in long-distance running along with the javelin throw. As Panchkula lacked a specialized javelin coach, he and fellow javelin thrower Parminder Singh downloaded videos of the Czech champion Jan Zelezny and attempted to copy his style. While initially at Tau Devi, Chopra typically achieved throws of around 55 metres, but soon increased his range, and in the National Junior Athletics Championships in Lucknow on 27 October 2012, won gold with a new national record throw of 68.40 metres.

International beginnings
In 2013, Neeraj Chopra entered his first international competition, the World Youth Championships in Ukraine. He won his first international medal in 2014, a silver at the Youth Olympics Qualification in Bangkok. He achieved his first throw of over 70 metres at the 2014 senior nationals.

In 2015, Chopra broke the previous world record in the junior category, throwing 81.04 metres in the 2015 All India Inter-University Athletics meet; this was his first throw of over 80 metres.

Chopra finished fifth at the 2015 National Games in Kerala, and received a callback for the national-level training camp as a result, leaving Panchkula in 2016 to train at Netaji Subhas National Institute of Sports, Patiala. According to Chopra, his inclusion in the national camp marked a turning point in his career, as he received better facilities, a better quality diet and an improved standard of training from that available at Panchkula. According to him, training with national level javelin throwers boosted his morale. Chopra was also assigned his first dedicated javelin coach, 2010 Commonwealth Games bronze medallist Kashinath Naik, but found Naik's training regimen too difficult and resumed training on his own after a month and a half.

2016 – 2018 
At the 2016 South Asian Games, Chopra achieved a new personal best during the athletics finals in Guwahati on 9 February, winning gold with a throw of 82.23 meters, though falling short of the 83-meter Olympic qualifying mark. He also began training under Australian coach Gary Calvert that month. Chopra won a gold medal in the 2016 IAAF World U20 Championships in Bydgoszcz, Poland and set a world junior record of 86.48 m, becoming the first Indian athlete to achieve a world record, at the same time setting a new national record. Although his U20 record surpassed that of defending Olympic champion Keshorn Walcott, Chopra failed to qualify for the 2016 Summer Olympics as the cut-off date had been 11 July, the week before the U20 championships. His preparations for Rio had also been hampered by a back injury sustained in April 2016 during the Federation Cup in New Delhi, which had noticeably affected his performance in competition.

In September 2016, he left the Netaji Subhas National Institute of Sports to train at the Sports Authority of India centre in Bangalore. He was formally inducted as a JCO in December 2016, and subsequently received extended leave to continue his training.

Chopra won gold in the 2017 Asian Athletics Championships with a throw of 85.23 metres. He then went to London in August for the World Championships, but was eliminated before reaching the finals. On 24 August, Chopra suffered a significant groin injury in the finals of the Zurich Diamond League, sustaining the injury during his third attempted throw, in which he attained a distance of 83.39 meters; owing to the injury, he fouled his fourth attempt and skipped his last two allowed attempts. His first and best throw of 83.80 meters gave him a seventh-place finish. As a result of his injury, he withdrew from competition for the remainder of 2017. After recovering from his injury, which he partly attributed to a heavy competition schedule and the lack of a proper diet and rest, Chopra spent a month at the Joint Services Wing sports institute in Vijayanagar. He then left for Offenburg, Germany in November to train for three months with Werner Daniels, whom he had briefly worked with before the 2017 World Championships. His former coach Calvert had left India in May due to disputes over his contract. During his stay in Offenburg, Chopra focused on strength training and honed his technique with Daniels' guidance, adjusting his stance and improving his range by keeping his hand raised higher during throws.

In the men's javelin throw at the 2018 Commonwealth Games, he registered a season-best effort of 86.47 metres, becoming the first Indian to win the javelin throw at the Commonwealth Games. In May 2018, he again broke the national record at the Doha Diamond League with a throw of 87.43 metres.

In August 2018, Chopra made his debut at the Asian Games representing India, and was also the flag-bearer for the Indian contingent during the 2018 Asian Games Parade of Nations. On 27 August, he threw a distance of 88.06 m to win gold in the Men's javelin throw at the 2018 Asian Games and bettered his own Indian national record. It was also India's first gold medal in the javelin throw at the Asian Games. Chopra was the only track and field athlete that year to be recommended by the Athletics Federation of India (AFI) for the country's highest sports award, the Major Dhyanchand Khel Ratna, but was awarded the Arjuna Award in September 2018. He was further rewarded by the army with an out-of-turn promotion to subedar in November.

In preparation for the 2020 Tokyo Olympics, subsequently postponed to 2021, Chopra trained with guidance from his German coach Uwe Hohn, biomechanics expert Klaus Bartonietz and physiotherapist Ishaan Marwaha. During 2018 – 2019, Hohn improved Chopra's throwing technique, which earlier was "wild" according to Hohn.

Injury and recovery 
Chopra missed the 2019 World Championships in Doha due to bone spurs in his right elbow, undergoing surgery in Mumbai on 3 May 2019, the day after the qualifying competitions for the 2020 Tokyo Olympics had begun. After a period of recuperation, involving meditation and rehabilitative training at Patiala and the Inspire Institute of Sport at Vijayanagar, Chopra travelled to South Africa in November 2019 for training under German biomechanics expert Klaus Bartoneitz. Previously, he had been coached by Gary Calvert and Werner Daniels.

After a 16-month hiatus, Chopra returned to international competition in January 2020 with a winning throw of 87.86 metres in the Athletics Central North West League Meeting in Potchefstroom, South Africa, which as a distance of over 85 meters qualified him for the Tokyo Olympiad.

After South Africa, Chopra travelled to Turkey for training, but was forced to return to India in March 2020 due to the COVID-19 pandemic. Owing to the pandemic and lockdown in India, Chopra spent the next year training at the NIS Patiala. In late 2020, the Athletics Federation of India and the Odisha state government aided the national javelin team by arranging a training camp at Kalinga Stadium in Bhubaneswar, which Chopra attended from December 2020 through February 2021.

On 5 March 2021, Chopra again broke his own national record with a throw of 88.07 m, which ranked him third-best internationally.

Owing to the pandemic, Chopra's visa application to travel to Sweden for training was rejected. After weeks of attempting to secure a visa, which Chopra described as frustrating, he was cleared to travel to Europe with his coach following the intervention of the Ministry of Youth Affairs and Sports and the Ministry of External Affairs. He flew to Paris on 5 June 2021 for a mandatory quarantine period before travelling to Portugal for the Meeting Cidade de Lisboa. He opened his international season of 2021 there with a throw of 83.18 metres, which earned him a gold medal.

He went on to compete in the Karlstad Meet in Sweden in June 2022, where he achieved a gold with a sub-par throw of 80.96 m. before winning a bronze in the Kuortane Games in Finland with a throw of 86.79 m. The 24-year-old won the gold medal with a throw of 86.69m his first and only legal throw. He attributed his reduced performance in Finland to a tendency to throw higher than he wanted, along with having to use a different javelin as his own was unavailable. Following the Kuortane Games, Chopra travelled to Lucerne to compete in the Spitzen Leichtathletik Luzern but decided to withdraw due to fatigue. He attempted to secure a visa for the United Kingdom to enter the Diamond League at Gateshead on 13 July, but faced difficulties due to the pandemic and instead continued training and honing his technique in Uppsala.

2020 Tokyo Olympics

On 4 August 2021, Chopra made his debut at the Olympics, representing India in the Japan National Stadium He topped his qualifying group for entry to the final with a throw of 86.65 metres.

Chopra won the gold medal in the final on 7 August with a throw of 87.58 m in his second attempt, becoming the first Indian Olympian to win a gold medal in athletics, and the first post-independence Indian Olympic medalist in athletics.

Chopra's medal gave India a final total of seven medals at the game, surpassing the country's previous best performance of six medals earned at the 2012 London Olympics. As a result of his performance in Tokyo, Chopra became the second-ranked athlete internationally in the men's javelin throw.

Chopra also became the second Indian to win an individual Olympic gold medal after Abhinav Bindra, who won the gold medal in men's 10 m air rifle in the 2008 Summer Olympics. He dedicated his win to sprinters Milkha Singh and P. T. Usha, both former Olympians from India.

According to some historians, Chopra is the first Olympic medalist in track and field for India, but this status is disputed. Both the International Olympic Committee and Indian Olympic Association officially recognise Norman Pritchard to have been the first Indian track and field Olympic medalist, having competed at the 1900 Paris Olympics, even though India was under British rule at that time.

2022

At the Paavo Nurmi Games in Turku, Finland on June 14, Chopra won the silver medal with a new personal best of 89.30m and registered the new national record.

He broke his own national record with a throw of 89.94 m in the Stockholm Diamond League; though he finished to achieve silver medal in the competition.

In year 2022, Chopra With his throw of 88.13m on his fourth attempt in the men's javelin throw final in Oregon, Neeraj Chopra ensured himself a historic silver medal. This is India's only second medal at the World Athletics Championships after long-jumper Anju Bobby George's bronze in 2003.

He opted out from 2022 commonwealth games due to an injury.

On August 26, 2022, he won first place at the Lausanne Diamond League meet with a throw of 89.09m, and qualified for the Zurich Final and 2023 World Athletics Championships, Budapest in Hungary.

On September 8, 2022, Neeraj Chopra won the 2022 Diamond League final in Zürich, with a best throw of 88.44m. He became the first Indian to do so.

International competitions
 NR−National Record
 WJR−World U20 Junior Record
 q−Qualification Round

Seasonal bests by year

Awards and recognition

Ribbon bar

National awards
Arjuna Award – 2018
Vishisht Seva Medal (VSM) – 2020 Republic Day honours
 Major Dhyan Chand Khel Ratna Award – 2021 
Param Vishisht Seva Medal (PVSM) - 2022 Republic Day honours
Padma Shri (fourth highest civilian honour) - 2022 Republic Day honours

Other
 Army Sports Institute (ASI) stadium of Pune cantonment renamed "Neeraj Chopra Stadium" by Defence Minister Rajnath Singh on 27 August 2021.
 Switzerland Tourism appointed Neeraj Chopra as its Friendship Ambassador.

Notes

See also 
 Athletics in India
 Javelin throw at the Olympics 
 Sport in India - overview of Sports tradition in India 
 India at the Olympics
 Athletics Federation of India, highest governing body of Athletics in India
 India at the 2020 Summer Olympics

References

External links
 
 
 
 
 

1997 births
Living people
People from Panipat district
Athletes from Haryana
Indian male javelin throwers
Athletes (track and field) at the 2020 Summer Olympics
Olympic athletes of India
Commonwealth Games medallists in athletics
Commonwealth Games gold medallists for India
Athletes (track and field) at the 2018 Commonwealth Games
Athletes (track and field) at the 2018 Asian Games
Asian Games gold medalists for India
Asian Games medalists in athletics (track and field)
Medalists at the 2018 Asian Games
South Asian Games gold medalists for India
Commonwealth Games gold medallists in athletics
Asian Games gold medalists in athletics (track and field)
South Asian Games gold medalists in athletics
Indian Army personnel
Recipients of the Vishisht Seva Medal
Recipients of the Arjuna Award
Olympic gold medalists for India
Olympic gold medalists in athletics (track and field)
Medalists at the 2020 Summer Olympics
Recipients of the Khel Ratna Award
Recipients of the Padma Shri in sports
Medallists at the 2018 Commonwealth Games
Recipients of the Param Vishisht Seva Medal